is a Japanese footballer currently playing as a defender for Vanraure Hachinohe.

Career statistics

Club
.

Notes

References

1994 births
Living people
Association football people from Hokkaido
Josai International University alumni
Japanese footballers
Association football defenders
Japan Football League players
J3 League players
Tokyo Musashino United FC players
ReinMeer Aomori players
Vanraure Hachinohe players